Daingerfield is a city and the county seat of Morris County, Texas, United States. The population was 2,560 at the 2010 census.

The bluegrass instrumental tune Old Dangerfield by Bill Monroe was named after the town of Daingerfield.

Geography

Daingerfield is located at  (33.030721, –94.724451).

Demographics

As of the 2020 United States census, there were 2,522 people, 1,035 households, and 674 families residing in the city.

Education

Daingerfield-Lone Star Independent School District is a school district based in Daingerfield, Texas (USA). Located in Morris County, a small portion of the district extends into Titus County. The district has four schools in Daingerfield including Daingerfield High School.

The school district was rated Academically Acceptable in its 2009 TEA accountability rating.

Notable people

 Ernest Wallace (1906–1985), historian of the South Plains, the Comanche Indians, and the State of Texas, was born in Daingerfield

See also

 First Baptist Church mass murder (1980)

References

External links

 Daingerfield-Lone Star ISD
 factfinder.census.gov

Cities in Morris County, Texas
Cities in Texas
County seats in Texas